"Thinking of You" is a song by American band Earth, Wind & Fire, released in January 1988 on Columbia Records as the third single from their fourteenth studio album, Touch the World (1987). It reached number one on the US Billboard Hot Dance Music/Club Play chart and number three on the Billboard Hot Soul Singles chart.

Overview
"Thinking of You" was produced and arranged by Maurice White. White also composed the song alongside Wayne Vaughn and Wanda Vaughn of the Emotions. Thinking of You came off EWF's 1987 album Touch The World.

"Thinking of You" spent two weeks atop the Billboard Hot Dance/Club Play chart in 1988.

During January 1988 a four minute long music video was issued by Columbia. The video was directed by David Hogan.

Critical reception
Phyl Garland of Stereo Review declared "and for that one unforgettably great song that graces every EW&F album, the candidate this time is Thinking of You, with its strutting rhythms, sassy horns and spirited vocal interplay".

Personnel
 Maurice White: songwriter, arranger, producer, lead vocals
 Wanda Vaughn: songwriter, background vocals
 Wayne Vaughn: songwriter, arranger, sequence programming
 Rhett Lawrence: drum programming, synthesizer, Fairlight CMI programming
 Ray Fuller: guitar
 Philip Bailey, Jeanette W. Williams: background vocals

Charts

References

1987 songs
1988 singles
Earth, Wind & Fire songs
Songs written by Maurice White
Columbia Records singles
Dance-pop songs